Kwok Wing Sun (born 11 September 1981) is a Hong Kong footballer who is last known to have played as a defender for 3 Sing.

Career

In 2006, Kwok signed for Hong Kong top flight side Tai Po, where he made over 49 league appearances and scored 1 goal, helping them win the 2008–09 Hong Kong FA Cup, their first major trophy. In 2017, he signed for Double Flower in the Hong Kong second tier. In 2019, Kwok signed for Hong Kong third tier club Kowloon City. In 2021, he signed for 3 Sing in the Hong Kong fourth tier.

References

External links
 

1981 births
Association football defenders
Double Flower FA players
Hong Kong First Division League players
Hong Kong footballers
Hong Kong Premier League players
Living people
Sun Hei SC players
Tai Po FC players
Tuen Mun SA players